Francia Jackson Cabrera (born November 8, 1975, in Santo Domingo) is a volleyball player from the Dominican Republic, who won the gold medal with the women's national team at the 2003 Pan American Games in her home town Santo Domingo, Dominican Republic.

Career
Jackson won the silver medal at the inaugural 2002 Pan-American Cup held in Mexicali, Mexico; there she was awarded "Best Setter".

Jackson was chosen to be the flag bearer at the 2004 Summer Olympics instead of the previously chosen athlete Felix Sánchez. Her team ended in the 11th place at the tournament.

Francia joined Mirador to play at the 2011 FIVB Women's Club World Championship. Her team finished in the 4th place after losing the Bronze Medal match to the Brazilian team Sollys/Nestle.

Clubs
  Mirador (2000–2004)
  CV Murillo (2007–2008)
  CV Laredo (2008–2009)
  GH Ecay (2009–2011)
  Mirador (2011)
  CV Madrid (2015 - )

Awards

Individuals
 2002 Pan-American Cup "Best Setter"

Clubs
 2004 Dominican Republic Distrito Nacional Superior Tournament –  Champion, with Mirador

References

External links
 FIVB profile

1975 births
Living people
Dominican Republic women's volleyball players
Volleyball players at the 2004 Summer Olympics
Olympic volleyball players of the Dominican Republic
Volleyball players at the 2003 Pan American Games
Pan American Games gold medalists for the Dominican Republic
Pan American Games medalists in volleyball
Central American and Caribbean Games gold medalists for the Dominican Republic
Central American and Caribbean Games silver medalists for the Dominican Republic
Competitors at the 1998 Central American and Caribbean Games
Competitors at the 2002 Central American and Caribbean Games
Setters (volleyball)
Expatriate volleyball players in Spain
Dominican Republic expatriate sportspeople in Spain
Central American and Caribbean Games medalists in volleyball
Medalists at the 2003 Pan American Games